Pilar Mateos Martín (born 1942 in Valladolid) is a Spanish writer of children's literature.

In her tales, she uses a simple vocabulary to talk about isolated, marginal or sad characters. She mixes reality and imagination in works where fantasy and dreams can create new realities.

Bibliography 
 Jeruso quiere ser gente, 1980
 Historias de Ninguno, 1981
 Capitanes de plástico, 1982
 Molinete, 1984
 La bruja Mon, 1984
 Lucas y Lucas. El rapto de Caballo Gris, 1984
 La isla menguante, 1987
 Mi tío Teo, 1987
 Quisicosas, 1988
 El pequeño Davirón, 1991
 ¡Qué desastre de niño!, 1992
 La casa imaginaria, 1993 
 Silveiro el grande, 1993
 Sin miedo a los brujos, 1995
 El reloj de las buenas horas, 1996 
 La bruja del pan "pringao", 1997
 Gata García, 1997
 Barbas Jonás y los títeres acatarrados, 1997
 El viejo que no salía en los cuentos, 1997
 El fantasma en calcetines, 1999
 Los chicos de al lado, 2005

Awards
 Jeruso quiere ser gente, 1980, premio El Barco de Vapor
 Historias de Ninguno, 1981, premio El barco de vapor
 Capitanes de plástico, 1982, premio Lazarillo
 Gata García, 1997, premio Edebé
 El fantasma en calcetines, 1999, premio Ala Delta
 2009, Cervantes Chico Prize

References

1942 births
Living people
Spanish children's writers
Spanish women children's writers
20th-century Spanish women writers
20th-century Spanish writers
21st-century Spanish women writers
21st-century Spanish writers
People from Valladolid